Balcer is a surname. Notable people with the surname include:

Bethany Balcer (born 1997), American soccer player
James Balcer, American politician
Léon Balcer, Canadian politician
Mieczysław Balcer, Polish footballer
René Balcer Canadian television writer, director and producer

See also
Balcer, Podlaskie Voivodeship, Polish village where Sofie Balcer is the queen of the farmers